Henri de Noailles, comte d'Ayen (1554–1623), son of Antoine, was a commander in the religious wars, and was made comte d'Ayen by Henry IV in 1593.

References

Noailles, Antoine, comte d'Ayen, Henri de
Noailles, Antoine, comte d'Ayen, Henri de
Noailles, Henry of
Noailles, comte d'Ayen, Henri de
Henri